1957's New South Wales Rugby Football League premiership was the 50th season of the rugby league competition based in Sydney. Ten teams from across the city competed for the J. J. Giltinan Shield during the season, which culminated in a grand final between St. George and Manly-Warringah.

Season summary

Teams

Regular season

Bold – Home game
X – Bye
Opponent for round listed above margin

Ladder

Ladder progression

Numbers highlighted in green indicate that the team finished the round inside the top 4.
Numbers highlighted in blue indicates the team finished first on the ladder in that round.
Numbers highlighted in red indicates the team finished last place on the ladder in that round.

Finals

Grand Final

Under 27 year-old coach Ken Arthurson, Manly were playing in their second grand final. The match began with Saints pounding the (then called) 'Seagulls' with some heavy tackling. Brian Clay in particular targeted Manly's Rex Mossop, often trapping the dual international forward with the ball. “Poppa” Clay had a fearsome reputation in defence and at one point he knocked the Manly captain George Hunter senseless.

Manly were up to the task in the first half with the score locked at 4–4 for 30 minutes. Straight after half time, the flood gates opened following a magnificent run up the centre by second-row forward Norm Provan. He palmed off Manly defenders, ran deep into their territory, high stepped past fullback Ron Willey and slipped the ball to Poppa Clay who scored under the posts.

A second Dragon try followed within three minutes and the game began to slip away from the Manly side. The Larry Writer reference quotes Manly coach Arthurson: "The sheer physical strength of the St. George team is in itself a formidable thing to overcome. Our fellows tried everything, but St. George had so much more to give. Those big fellows are so clever."

Harry Bath kicked eight goals from eight attempts establishing a standing record for the most goals in a grand final and the most points scored in a grand final (16). His fellow ball playing forward and tactician Ken Kearney had returned for this, the first of five successful seasons as coach (four as captain-coach).

St. George 31 (Tries: Clay 2, Ryan, Fifield, Lumsden. Goals: Bath 8.)

Manly 9 (Tries: Burke. Goals: Willey 3.)

Player statistics
The following statistics are as of the conclusion of Round 18.

Top 5 point scorers

Top 5 try scorers

Top 5 goal scorers

References
 Rugby League Tables - Season 1957 The World of Rugby League
 Writer, Larry (1995) Never Before, Never Again, Pan MacMillan, Sydney

Footnotes

External links
Results:1951-60 at rabbitohs.com.au
1957 J J Giltinan Shield at rleague.com
NSWRFL season 1957 at rugbyleagueproject.com
1957 Final at Dragons History site

New South Wales Rugby League premiership
Nswrfl Season